Juan Carlos Ríos Vidal (born 17 November 1964) is a Spanish football manager and former player.

Manager career
Born in Sanlúcar de Barrameda, Cádiz, Andalusia, Ríos began his managerial career at Atlético Sanluqueño CF's youth setup, club which he represented as a player. In the 2003 summer, after managing Sanluqueño's main squad and Real Balompédica Linense, he was appointed CD Alcalá manager, winning promotion to Segunda División B in his first campaign.

In April 2008 Ríos returned to Alcalá, after a stint at Linense. On 6 June 2008, he was appointed at the helm of Tercera División's UD Almería B, taking the club to the third level for the first time ever.

On 23 June 2009, Ríos was named manager of another reserve team, Recreativo de Huelva B also in the fourth division. In October 2010 he was appointed at the helm of the main squad in Segunda División, replacing fired Pablo Alfaro.

On 19 May 2011, Ríos signed a new deal with Recre, after avoiding relegation during the campaign. On 22 June, however, he resigned, and joined fellow league team FC Cartagena in December; he left the latter in July 2012, after suffering relegation.

On 20 February 2013, Ríos was appointed Xerez CD manager. He was relieved from his duties in June, with the club being relegated as dead last, and moved to Atlético Sanluqueño; he was sacked by the latter in January 2014.

References

External links

1964 births
Living people
People from Sanlúcar de Barrameda
Sportspeople from the Province of Cádiz
Spanish footballers
Footballers from Andalusia
Association football midfielders
Segunda División B players
Tercera División players
Atlético Sanluqueño CF players
Racing Club Portuense players
Spanish football managers
Segunda División managers
UD Almería B managers
Recreativo de Huelva managers
FC Cartagena managers
Xerez CD managers